The Nissan S-platform was Nissan's rear wheel drive sports automobile platform, produced from model year 1976 to 2002.  It was sold in every major market where Nissan cars were available.  It was usually equipped with an inline four-cylinder engine, and had four seats in a "two-plus-two" configuration.

Model/Engine/Region Breakdown

References
 Nissan Museum: Silvia
Club S12 S12 owners' resource.

S